Michal Linial is a Professor of Biochemistry and Bioinformatics at the Hebrew University of Jerusalem (HUJI). Linial is the Director of The Sudarsky Center for Computational Biology at HUJI. Since 2015, she is head of the ELIXIR-Israel node (European life-sciences Infrastructure for biological Information).

Linial was elected a fellow of the  International Society for Computational Biology (ISCB) in 2016, for outstanding contributions to the fields of computational biology and bioinformatics, and served on the Board of Directors (2005–2016), and as a Vice-President (2007–2016), of the ISCB.

She was a Director at the Israel Institute for Advanced Studies (IIAS) from 2012 to 2018. She earned her BA from Tel Aviv University in 1979, her MA from UCLA in 1981, and her PhD in molecular biology from HUJI in 1986.  Linial completed her post-doctoral training at Stanford University in cellular neurochemistry. She joined the faculty of HUJI in 1989, and she founded and has chaired since 1999, the educational program for computational biology in HUJI.

Linial came to wider public prominence during the COVID-19 pandemic as her research and forecasts on the virus were carried in mainstream media.

See also
Ziv Bar-Joseph
COVID-19 pandemic
ELIXIR

References

External links

Michal Linial, International Society for Computational Biology (2014)
Michal Linial, Head of Node, ELIXIR Israel (2020)
Michal Linial Lab, the Hebrew University of Jerusalem

Living people
Israeli bioinformaticians
Year of birth missing (living people)
Academic staff of the Hebrew University of Jerusalem
Fellows of the International Society for Computational Biology
Hebrew University of Jerusalem alumni
Tel Aviv University alumni
University of California, Los Angeles alumni
Israeli women academics
21st-century Israeli educators
21st-century women educators